Tumtum or Tum Tum may refer to:

 Tumtum language, a Kadu language spoken in Kordofan
Tumtum (Judaism), a Talmudic gender concept for certain intersex people
 Tumtum Tree, a fictional tree mentioned in the poem "Jabberwocky" by Lewis Carroll
 Tumtum and Nutmeg, the first of a series of children's books by author Emily Bearn
Thristan Mendoza (born 1989), a Filipino marimba prodigy
Lourawls Nairn Jr. (born 1994), a Bahamian basketball player
SS Tum Tum, a Canadian steamship
Tum Tum, a boy ninja character from the 3 Ninjas film series

Places
 Tumtum, Washington, a community in Stevens County, Washington, US
 Tumtum Lake, a small lake located in the Upper Adams River valley in the Interior of British Columbia, Canada
 Tumtum Peak, a summit in Mount Rainier National Park
 Tumtum River, a river in the U.S. state of Oregon

See also 

 Tummy, an informal word for the human abdomen or stomach
 Tum (disambiguation)
 Jabberwocky (disambiguation)